Thomas Howard (2 May 1877 – 6 October 1965) was an Australian cricketer. He played seven first-class matches for New South Wales between 1899/1900 and 1902/03. He also managed the Australian team that toured New Zealand in 1920-21.

See also
 List of New South Wales representative cricketers

References

External links
 

1877 births
1965 deaths
Australian cricketers
New South Wales cricketers
Cricketers from Sydney
Australian cricket administrators